Ayaan Khan (born 30 August 1992) is an Indian-born cricketer who plays for the Oman cricket team.

Career
He made his Twenty20 debut on 10 January 2016, for Madhya Pradesh in the 2015–16 Syed Mushtaq Ali Trophy tournament in India. While playing for the Muscat Cricket Team, Khan twice won Oman Cricket's player of the month award. In September 2021, Khan won the player of the match award for his performance in a one-day match against Mumbai. Later the same month, Khan was named in Oman's squad for the 2021 ICC Men's T20 World Cup. He was one of two uncapped players to be named in Oman's squad. He was also named in Oman's One Day International (ODI) squad for their tri-series in Oman. He made his ODI debut on 14 September 2021, for Oman against Nepal. He made his Twenty20 International (T20I) debut on 17 October 2021, for Oman against Papua New Guinea.

References

External links
 

1992 births
Living people
Indian cricketers
Omani cricketers
Oman One Day International cricketers
Oman Twenty20 International cricketers
Madhya Pradesh cricketers
Cricketers from Bhopal
Indian emigrants to Oman
Indian expatriates in Oman